Róisín Ní Chúaláin, Irish actress, plays Lee on the Irish language drama, Ros na Rún.

Ní Chúaláin has performed in the drama since 2005, and began acting in Galway's Town Hall Theatre.

A native of Carna, she enjoys the cinema, gym, socialising and dancing. She has performed works in both Irish and English.

External links
 https://web.archive.org/web/20090830012902/http://r0snarun.com/index.php?option=com_content&task=view&id=40&Itemid=61

Irish stage actresses
Irish television actresses
Actresses from County Galway
Living people
20th-century Irish people
21st-century Irish people
Year of birth missing (living people)